Jake O'Brien (born 15 May 2001) is an Irish professional footballer who plays as a defender for Belgian club RWD Molenbeek, on loan from English club Crystal Palace.

Early life
Born in County Cork, O'Brien grew up in Youghal, and in his youth also boxed and played hurling, winning national championships in both at Under-14s level.

Club career
O'Brien played for Cork City before moving on loan to English club Crystal Palace in February 2021, with the move made permanent in August 2021. He appeared for the Under-23 team at Palace, including in the EFL Trophy. He moved on loan to Swindon Town in January 2022, playing a total of 21 games.

In August 2022, O'Brien was loaned to Belgian club RWD Molenbeek, along with teammate Luke Plange, for the 2022–23 season.

International career
He has represented Ireland at under-21 level.

Career statistics

References

2001 births
Living people
Republic of Ireland association footballers
Association footballers from County Cork
Cork City F.C. players
Crystal Palace F.C. players
Swindon Town F.C. players
League of Ireland players
English Football League players
Association football defenders
Republic of Ireland under-21 international footballers
RWDM47 players
Republic of Ireland expatriate association footballers
Irish expatriate sportspeople in England
Expatriate footballers in England
Irish expatriates in Belgium
Expatriate footballers in Belgium
Challenger Pro League players